Mukedi Airport  is an airport serving the town of Mukedi in Kwilu Province, Democratic Republic of the Congo.

See also

Transport in the Democratic Republic of the Congo
List of airports in the Democratic Republic of the Congo

References

External links
 OpenStreetMap - Mukedi Airport
 FallingRain - Mukedi Airport
 HERE Maps - Mukedi
 OurAirports - Mukedi
 

Airports in Kwilu Province